The 1958 Utah State Aggies football team was an American football team that represented Utah State University in the Skyline Conference during the 1958 NCAA University Division football season. In their fourth season under head coach Ev Faunce, the Aggies compiled a 3–7 record (2–5 against Skyline opponents), tied for sixth in the Skyline Conference, and were outscored by opponents by a total of 188 to 123.

Schedule

References

Utah State
Utah State Aggies football seasons
Utah State Aggies football